Charalampos Prokopios Chantzopoulos (born 8 July 1994) is a German-born Greek professional footballer who plays as a centre-back for Finnish club KPV.

References

External links
 Profile at FuPa.net

1994 births
Living people
Sportspeople from Bielefeld
Footballers from North Rhine-Westphalia
Citizens of Greece through descent
Greek footballers
German footballers
German people of Greek descent
Sportspeople of Greek descent
Greek expatriates in Finland
Expatriate footballers in Finland
Association football defenders
FC Gütersloh 2000 players
FF Jaro players
FC Rot-Weiß Erfurt players
Sacramento Republic FC players
USL Championship players
Ykkönen players
3. Liga players
Greek expatriate footballers
Greek expatriates in the United States
Expatriate soccer players in the United States